Island Lake is a village in Lake and McHenry counties in the U.S. state of Illinois. Per the 2020 census, the population was 8,051. The village surrounds Island Lake, a lake which contains a small island.

History
The village was incorporated on June 25, 1952.

Geography
Island Lake is a village located at  (42.277691, -88.200747), lying in the northwest Chicago suburbs.

Demographics

2020 census

2000 Census
As of the census of 2000, there were 8,153 people, 2,837 households, and 2,150 families living in the village. The racial makeup of the village was 93.79% White, 0.49% African American, 0.16% Native American, 1.62% Asian, 0.01% Pacific Islander, 2.72% from other races, and 1.20% from two or more races. 8.33% of the population were Hispanic or Latino of any race.

There were 2,837 households, out of which 46.8% had children under the age of 18 living with them, 63.8% were married couples living together, 8.6% had a female householder with no husband present, and 24.2% were non-families. 18.6% of all households were made up of individuals, and 2.7% had someone living alone who was 65 years of age or older. The average household size was 2.87 and the average family size was 3.31.

In the village, the population was spread out, with 32.0% under the age of 18, 5.8% from 18 to 24, 42.8% from 25 to 44, 15.0% from 45 to 64, and 4.4% who were 65 years of age or older. The median age was 32 years. For every 100 females, there were 98.6 males. For every 100 females age 18 and over, there were 96.7 males.

The median income for a household in the village was $63,455, and the median income for a family was $67,500. Males had a median income of $47,276 versus $35,957 for females. The per capita income for the village was $24,206. 2.6% of the population and 1.9% of families were below the poverty line. 2.2% of those under the age of 18 and 6.0% of those 65 and older were living below the poverty line.

Education
School-age residents of Island Lake attend Wauconda CUSD 118.

References

External links
Village of Island Lake
Population Census

Villages in McHenry County, Illinois
Chicago metropolitan area
Villages in Illinois
Villages in Lake County, Illinois